Hyaleucerea panacea is a moth of the subfamily Arctiinae. It was described by Druce in 1884. It is found in Costa Rica.

References

Euchromiina
Moths described in 1884